Rick Wakeman's Criminal Record is a studio album by English keyboardist Rick Wakeman, released in November 1977 on A&M Records. After touring his previous album No Earthly Connection in August 1976, Wakeman rejoined the progressive rock band Yes as they recorded Going for the One (1977) in Switzerland. When recording finished, he started work on a new solo record which took form as a keyboard-oriented instrumental album similar to that of his earlier album, The Six Wives of Henry VIII (1973), and loosely based on criminality. Several guest musicians play on the record, including Chris Squire and Alan White of Yes, percussionist Frank Ricotti, and comedian Bill Oddie on vocals.

The album received some mixed reviews upon release, and reached No. 25 in the UK. In 2006, the album was remastered as a limited edition with 5,000 copies produced.

Background
In August 1976, Wakeman finished touring his previous studio album, No Earthly Connection. The album and tour was a musical departure for Wakeman, as he had scored worldwide success with three concept albums and toured with symphony orchestras and choirs, and by the end of 1975, had become costly endeavours. The 1976 tour had barely broke even, and Wakeman fell into financial trouble which was partly down to tax payments he could no longer afford. To combat this, he became a tax exile, recording No Earthly Connection in France, and entered tentative rehearsals for a new rock trio with drummer Bill Bruford and vocalist and bassist John Wetton. After they split, Wakeman rejoined the progressive rock band Yes as they were recording Going for the One (1977) at Montreux, Switzerland, where Wakeman lived until 1980. During his first Christmas in Montreux, Wakeman came up with the album during a meal, where he was asked if he had a criminal record.

Wakeman did not start work on the album until April 1977, when recording for Going for the One was complete as making a band and a solo album simultaneously was not feasible. With members of Yes and the production crew still in Montreux, Yes bassist Chris Squire asked Wakeman about the project during a visit in the White Horse pub in Montreux, and learned that the keyboardist intended to produce an album with its concept based on criminality, and revealed its title. At the time, Wakeman wished for the album to feature a band playing, but wanted to do "something completely different this time around" and pointed out that typically, the keyboard tracks got put down last after the group had played their parts, leaving the keyboards fighting for space around the pre-recorded music. Wakeman, however, wished for Criminal Record to be similar to his first, The Six Wives of Henry VIII (1973), and be an album where the keyboards take precedence. He also described Criminal Record as "a 1977 version of Henry", of which its music was a follow-up to what he had put on his second soundtrack album, White Rock (1977).

Recording

The album was recorded at Mountain Studios from April to June 1977 with John Timperley as engineer and mixer and Dave Richards as assistant engineer. Wakeman put his keyboard parts down first, followed by bass guitar and drums. Squire and Yes drummer Alan White agreed to play the respective parts, and are featured on side one of the album. However, instead of giving Squire and White preconceived music or ideas on what to play, Wakeman told the pair to record what they wanted on top of the keyboards, thereby giving them complete control of what they played. He added: "I deliberately didn't go anywhere near the studio. [...] The first time I heard it was after about ten days, I can't even remember where I went. I didn't even stay in Switzerland!"

After Richards informed Wakeman of the completion of the bass and drum parts, Wakeman returned to the studio and enjoyed listening back to the songs transformed as it felt like he was listening to them for the first time. He remembered White called him "some gynaecological term" as the music continually varied in pace and he had refused to use a click track due to his distaste of them. Wakeman praised Squire in particular as he contributed some interesting parts that he would not have thought to write. Wakeman was so pleased with Squire and White's performance, he wished to re-record and re-arrange some of his keyboard parts, but there were insufficient tracks left to use and no more budget. The final parts were put down by percussionist Frank Ricotti, who added timpani and tuned percussion, and comedian Bill Oddie of The Goodies fame, who provided record a humorous, tongue-in-cheek lyric for "The Breathalyser". Both were recorded in the course of a day.

The scream at the end of "Chamber of Horrors" was by a woman that Wakeman had met in a local pub in Montreux. He asked every girl in the pub to scream, and chose the best sounding one to record it in the studio. Wakeman recalled: "She dutifully screamed once more and then went back to the pub." "Birdman of Alcatraz" features birds chirping in the middle. The choir on "Judas Iscariot" is the Ars Laeta of Lausanne, and were recorded at a church in Les Planches, outside Montreux. Also featured is the church organ at St. Martin's church in Vevey, the same organ used on Going for the One.

Release

The album was released in November 1977, while Yes were on tour.

In 2006, Hip-O Select Records issued 5,000 individually numbered CDs which marked the first time the album was released on CD outside Japan. In 2014, it was released on CD once more by Real Gone Music.

Wakeman looked back on Criminal Record as one that did not quite come out as he wanted, except for "Judas Iscariot". Despite calling it a "nearly" album and questioning whether it should have been recorded with The Six Wives of Henry VIII in mind, Wakeman said there were "some excellent all round performances". In 2003, Wakeman recalled A&M Records "couldn't understand it" and claimed the label continued to hold some dissatisfaction towards it.

In 1979, "Birdman of Alcatraz" was used as the theme music to the BBC television drama series My Son, My Son. It was subsequently released as a single with "Flacons de Neige" from Rhapsodies (1979) on the B-side.

Track listing

Personnel
Credits are adapted from the album's sleeve notes.

Music
 Rick Wakeman – Steinway 9' grand piano, Minimoog synthesiser, Polymoog synthesiser, Hammond C3 organ, Birotron, Mander pipe organ at St. Martin's church in Vevey, RMI computer keyboard, harpsichord, Fender Rhodes 88 electric piano, Hohner clavinet, Baldwin electric harpsichord
 Chris Squire – bass guitar on "Statue of Justice", "Crime of Passion", and "Chamber of Horrors"
 Alan White – drums on "Statue of Justice", "Crime of Passion", and "Chamber of Horrors"
 Frank Ricotti – percussion on "Statue of Justice", "Crime of Passion", "Chamber of Horrors", and "Judas Iscariot"
 Bill Oddie – vocals on "The Breathalyser"
 Ars Laeta Choir of Lausanne – choir on "Judas Iscariot"
 Alto vocals – Anne Claude, Christiane Durel, Christine Frehholz, Elisabeth Pahud, Francoise Wannaz, Janine Isaaz, Janine Pradervand, Josianne Henn, Liliane De Berville, Marlyse Berney, Mary Lise Perey, Nicole Metraus, Pierre Humbert
 Bass vocals – Claude Alain Morasini, George Caille, Jean-Michel Favez, Peirre Tharin, Piere Alain Favez, Roland Demiville, Samuel Chetrit, Yves Lamberey
 Soprano vocals – Anne Catherine Noinat, Annette Fonjallaz, Christine Riesen, Claire-Lisa Valet, Claudine Corbaz, Claudine Mange, Daniele Meystre, Eliane Henchoz, Francoise Cardinaux, Francoise Cottet, Lise Dutray, Marlyse Paschoud, Sylviane Savez
 Tenor vocals – Andre Borboen, Bernard Dutruy, Charles Moinat, Claude Alain Von Buren, Daniel Borgeaud, Francoise Emery, Jean Maurice Juvet, Raphael Bugnon, Rene Monachon
 Robert Mernoud – choir conductor on "Judas Iscariot"

Production
 Rick Wakeman – production
 John Timperley – engineer, mixing
 Dave Richards - assistant engineer on "Statue of Justice", "Crime of Passion", and "Chamber of Horrors", mixing
 Chuck Beeson – visual concept, design
 Roland Young – art direction

Charts

References

1977 albums
Rick Wakeman albums
A&M Records albums
Concept albums